El Chicano may refer to:
El Chicano, a musical group from Los Angeles
El Chicano (film), a 2019 American superhero film
El Chicano (wrestler), the professional alias of wrestler Carlos Cotto

See also
Chicano (disambiguation)